Tevita Li (born 23 March 1995) is a New Zealand rugby union player who currently plays as a wing for  in New Zealand's domestic Mitre 10 Cup and the  in the international Super Rugby competition.

Early career

Born and raised in Auckland, New Zealand, Li was educated at Massey High School in his home town where he played first XV rugby.

Senior career

Li made his senior debut for  during the 2013 ITM Cup while aged just 18 years old and still a high school student.   He managed 1 try in 4 games in his first season of provincial rugby and was subsequently promoted to the full squad for 2014.   His second season saw him feature in all 10 of Harbour's championship matches and score 3 tries as the men from Auckland's North Shore finished in 5th place on the log, just missing out on the promotion playoffs.

He started every game in 2015 and helped himself to 4 tries as Harbour once again came agonisingly close to securing a playoff berth, only to fall just short and end up in 5th spot. Li was again an ever-present, starting all 12 of Harbour's games during the year as well as bagging a career high 7 season tries including the opening try in the epic 40-37 semi-final victory away to Wellington.

Super Rugby

Li's swift rise from high school prodigy to the upper echelons of the rugby world continued apace in 2014 when Auckland-based Super Rugby franchise, the  included him in their wider training group for the 2014 Super Rugby season. He went on to score 3 tries in 8 matches in his first season of Super Rugby, at the age of 19.   2015 saw a little stagnation in his progress, featuring 7 times and failing to cross the try line once as the Blues endured a horror season, winning just 3 of 16 games to finish in 14th spot on the overall log.

Prior to the start of the 2016 Super Rugby season Tana Umaga replaced Sir John Kirwan as Blues head coach and this brought about an upturn in fortunes both for the franchise and for Li personally. The Blues finished in a more respectable 11th place, still well away from the playoff spots, while Li started all 15 of their regular season games and scored 4 tries in what would prove to be his final season in Auckland.

International

Li was a New Zealand Schools representative in 2012 and was also a member of the New Zealand Under-20 sides which competed in the 2014 IRB Junior World Championship and 2015 World Rugby Under 20 Championship.   He scored 7 tries in 5 games in 2014 to help New Zealand to 3rd place in their home tournament and followed that up with 6 tries in 5 games in Italy the following year including a hat-trick against France which made him the highest try-scorer in tournament history.   Li's tries also helped New Zealand to lift the World Under-20 Championship title for the first time since 2011 as they progressed through the tournament unbeaten and defeated England 21-16 in the final in Cremona.

Career honours

New Zealand Under-20

World Rugby Under 20 Championship - 2015

North Harbour

Mitre 10 Cup Championship - 2016

Super Rugby statistics

References

External links
 

1995 births
New Zealand rugby union players
New Zealand sportspeople of Tongan descent
Rugby union wings
North Harbour rugby union players
Blues (Super Rugby) players
Rugby union players from Auckland
People educated at Massey High School
Living people
Highlanders (rugby union) players
Tokyo Sungoliath players